Ciceu may refer to several places in Romania:

Ciceu, a commune in Harghita County
Ciceu-Giurgești, a commune in Bistrița-Năsăud County
Ciceu-Mihăiești, a commune in Bistrița-Năsăud County
Ciceu-Corabia, a village in Ciceu-Mihăiești Commune, Bistrița-Năsăud County
Ciceu-Poieni, a village in Căianu Mic Commune, Bistrița-Năsăud County
Cristeștii Ciceului and Hășmașu Ciceului, villages in Uriu Commune, Bistrița-Năsăud County

People 
 Adrian Ciceu, Romanian music artist and collector of Japanese prints especially by Ohara Koson 
 Eugen Cicero (1940–1997), born Eugen Ciceu, jazz pianist and brother of Adrian Ciceu

References